The discography of singles, promo singles, remixes and Latin tracks for Cuban-American singer Gloria Estefan and Miami Sound Machine consists of 50 singles (solo), 18 promotional singles (solo) and eight other guest or special appearance singles as a solo artist. Although Miami Sound Machine was no longer featured in the credits from 1989 onwards, they remain Estefan's backing group until this day, though none of the original members remain.

With a second decade of sizeable hits, Gloria continued her career as a solo artist. Her most successful songs being "Don't Wanna Lose You", Billboard number 1, "Get on Your Feet", "Conga", (with Miami Sound Machine) considered her signature song, "Here We Are", another top 10 hit, and "Coming Out of the Dark", yet another number-one hit for Estefan,

Her Latin career is as successful as her Anglo career. She has released many songs which were hits on the United States Latin radio stations. Estefan is the female artist with most number-one hits on the Hot Latin Songs chart of Billboard magazine, having a total of fourteen hits spending a combined forty weeks at number 1. Among the most successful Latin singles are: "Mi Tierra", "Si Voy a Perderte", "Con Los Años Que Me Quedan", "Abriendo Puertas", "Tres Deseos", "No Me Dejes de Querer" and "Tradición", which also became Gloria's first number-one hit on the Hot Dance Club Songs being the first song on Spanish language to do it so.

This is a discography about Estefan's singles chart performance. To see Estefan's albums chart performance, see Gloria Estefan albums discography.

Miami Sound Machine

Miami Sound Machine was fronted by Gloria Estefan during 1977 through 1988. In the later years, releases were credited to just Estefan as a solo artist. None of the original members of the group currently perform with her.

In the early years, the band wasn't very successful globally because Estefan sang most of the songs in Spanish. The first single to make a sizeable dent in popularity was "Dr. Beat", a top 10 hit in the UK in 1984. That was followed by "Mancunian Rumba" in 1985, a single first released in 1983, but re-released to capitalize on the success of "Dr. Beat". It was a big hit in Europe and a club hit in the US.

The group's breakthrough single in the US came in 1985 with the release of the lead single from their second studio-album Primitive Love. "Conga" made the Top Ten on the Billboard Hot 100 and was also a dance hit globally.

Other big singles came with the release of the group's third studio album, Let It Loose.  This was not only their biggest-selling album, but included their first number-one song in many places.  In the US, the band's fourth single, "Anything for You", became their first-number one song on the Billboard Hot 100. Another song, "Can't Stay Away From You", became a number-one hit in the Netherlands, their first-number one song outside the United States.

The band enjoyed continued success with their singles through their final release, "1-2-3", which was a top ten in the United States. Following that release, Gloria Estefan was credited on releases as a solo artist. Her backup group is still referred to as the Miami Sound Machine, however, none of the original members of the group currently perform with Estefan.

1977–1983

1984–1988

Other songs
 "Renacer" from Live Again/Renacer, released as a single in Peru in 1977.
 "Usted abusó" from Miami Sound Machine, released as a single in Peru in 1978.
 "Me enamoré" from Otra Vez, released as a single in Peru and Argentina in 1981.
 "Dingui-Li-Bangui" from Rio, released as a single in Peru in 1982.
 "Toda tuya" from Rio, released as a single in Costa Rica in 1982.
 "Los ojos del amor" from A Toda Maquina, released as a single in Peru in 1983.
 "I Need Your Love" released as a single in the Philippines in 1984.
 "Hot Summer Nights" recorded for the Top Gun soundtrack, released as a single in the Netherlands in 1986.
 "Suave" recorded for the Cobra soundtrack in 1986.

Gloria Estefan

1989–1995

1996–2010

2011–present

Notes

As a featured artist or special performances

Promotional singles

1990–2000

2000–2010

Collaborations
 Background vocals on the Jon Secada single "Just Another Day" 
 "Come Rain or Come Shine" with Frank Sinatra for his 1993 album, Duets.
 "Is It Love That We're Missing" in Quincy Jones Q's Jook Joint.
 "Because You Loved Me",  with Celine Dion, on her special on CBS, she also sang "Conga".
 "Music of My Heart", with *NSYNC on the 1999 soundtrack from the film Music of the Heart, in which Estefan starred.
 "Gonna Eat for Christmas" with Rosie O'Donnell on her album A Rosie Christmas.
 "There Must Be a Better World Somewhere" with BB King on his album B.B. King & Friends: 80.
 "En El Jardín" with Alejandro Fernández on his album Me Estoy Enamorando on 1998.
 "Mambo I I I" in Sesame Street's Elmopalooza! released in 1998.
 "What More Can I Give" a track produced by Michael Jackson in English and Spanish language. Featuring other artists such as Anastacia, Celine Dion, Mariah Carey, Ricky Martin, Reba McEntire, Luther Vandross, Thalía, Marc Anthony, *NSYNC, Beyoncé, Carlos Santana and others.
 "(You Make Me Feel Like A) Natural Woman" with Aretha Franklin and Bonnie Raitt on Franklin's album Jewels in the Crown: All-Star Duets with the Queen in 2007.
 "Usted", a duet with José Feliciano on his 2010 album, Canciones de Amor - Love Songs.
 "I Take It Back" with The E Family for their 2010 album, Now and Forever.
 "Who Can I Turn To (When Nobody Needs Me)" with Tony Bennett in 2012 at Bennet's Viva Duets.
 "Think I'm in Love Again" with Paul Anka for his 2013 album, Duets.
 "Mary's Boy Child" with Johnny Mathis for his 2013 holiday album, Sending You A Little Christmas.
 "Christmas Auld Lang Syne" with Tiempo Libre for Joshua Bell 2013 holiday collection Musical Gifts from Joshua Bell and Friends.
 "Besos de Lejos" with Santana from their 2014 studio album, Corazón.

Other songs
 "Go Marlins" – released as a limited edition single in Florida in 1997 when the Florida Marlins major league baseball team won their first World Series. The song was the same tune as the single "Higher" but with new lyrics.
 "Miami" (Miami Mix) featuring Miami Sound Machine – Part of the CD single of Will Smith's song "Miami" as a remix to the song.
 "Love on Layaway" from the 1999 compilation album And So This Is Christmas.
 "Young Hearts Run Free" from the 2005 TV soundtrack Music from and Inspired by Desperate Housewives.
 "See with Your Heart" from the 2006 children's book Noelle's Treasure Tale by Gloria Estefan.

See also
 List of best-selling music artists

References

 
Latin pop music discographies
Discographies of Cuban artists
Discographies of American artists
Tropical music discographies